The Rohrbach Ro XI Rostra was a flying boat built in Germany in 1928 for use as a transatlantic mail plane.

Design and development
The Ro XI shared the same general configuration its predecessor, the Ro V Rocco: a conventional, high-wing flying boat with cruciform empennage and two engines mounted tractor-fashion in nacelles mounted on struts above the wing. The flight deck and cabin were fully enclosed. However, while the Rocco's wings had been braced by struts, the Rostra's wings were a fully cantilever design. The aircraft featured a set of masts and sails that could be deployed for extended travel on water in the event of a forced landing.

By late 1928, Philadelphia journalist Mildred Johnson was organising an east-to-west transatlantic flight aboard the Rostra, initially with three other passengers, but later as the sole passenger. In middle of 1929, the Rostra made a preliminary  round trip between Travemünde and Stockholm carrying ten passengers, and a longer-range flight to Iceland was planned.

Specifications

See also

References

1920s German mailplanes
Flying boats
Rostra
High-wing aircraft
Aircraft first flown in 1928
Twin piston-engined tractor aircraft